Yeniel Bermúdez Ferrer (born October 8, 1985 in Cienfuegos) is a Cuban footballer who last played for Los Angeles Blues in the USL Professional Division.

Club career

Cuba
Bermúdez began his career in his native Cuba, playing with FC Cienfuegos in the Campeonato Nacional de Fútbol de Cuba.

While playing for the Cuban U-23 national team in the Olympic qualifying tournament in Tampa, Florida in March 2008, Bermudez along with several other members of the team, defected to the United States under the wet foot dry foot scheme that allows Cubans who reach U.S. soil to obtain asylum. After his defection, Bermudez declared his brother was dismissed from Cuba's under-20 team as a result.

United States
Following an unsuccessful trial with Los Angeles Galaxy, Bermudez was signed to a professional contract by Charleston Battery after impressing coach Michael Anhaeuser during pre-season. He made his professional debut on May 8, 2009, in game against Carolina RailHawks.

Bermudez was not listed on the 2011 roster for Charleston released on April 7, 2011. In 2010, he spent time in Alaska with his girlfriend who worked there at a school.

International career
He made his international debut for Cuba in a September 2006 CONCACAF Gold Cup qualification match against Turks & Caicos and has earned a total of 8 caps, scoring no goals. His final international was a February 2008 friendly match against Guyana, a month prior to defecting to the United States.

Honors

Charleston Battery
USL Second Division Champions (1): 2010
USL Second Division Regular Season Champions (1): 2010

References

External links
 
 Charleston Battery bio

1985 births
Living people
People from Cienfuegos
Defecting Cuban footballers
Association football defenders
Cuban footballers
Cuba international footballers
FC Cienfuegos players
Charleston Battery players
Wilmington Hammerheads FC players
Club Atlético River Plate Puerto Rico players
Orange County SC players
USL First Division players
USL Second Division players
USL Championship players
Cuban expatriate footballers
Expatriate soccer players in the United States